Paul Alexandru Șerban (born 16 July 2001) is a Romanian professional footballer who plays as a goalkeeper for Farul II Constanța.

Honours
Viitorul Constanța
Cupa României: 2018–19

References

External links
 
 Paul Șerban at lpf.ro

2001 births
Living people
Sportspeople from Constanța
Romanian footballers
Romania youth international footballers
Association football goalkeepers
Liga I players
Liga III players
FC Viitorul Constanța players
FCV Farul Constanța players